Ben Wallace most commonly refers to:
Ben Wallace (basketball) (born 1974), American basketball player
Ben Wallace (politician) (born 1970), British Secretary of State for Defence

Ben Wallace may also refer to:
Benjamin Wallace (circus owner) (1847–1921), American circus owner
Bennie Wallace (born 1946), American jazz tenor saxophonist
Benjamin Wallace (writer) (born 1968/1969), American author and magazine writer